The Fairmile Type-B motor launch was a type of motor launch (often referred to as MLs) built by British boatbuilder Fairmile Marine and others during the Second World War for the Royal Navy for coastal operations.

Design
While the Type A had been designed entirely by Fairmile, the Type B design had come from Bill Holt of the Admiralty based on the lines of a destroyer hull and the detailed design and production was taken on by Fairmile.

Like all their designs it was based on total prefabrication so individual components could be contracted out to small factories for production and these arranged as kits that would be delivered to various boatyards for assembly and fitting out.

Altogether approximately 650 boats were built between 1940 and 1945. Like the A Type, the B Type were initially intended as submarine chasers, so the boats were fitted with ASDIC (sonar) as standard. Their main armament initially reflected their anti-submarine focus, with 12 depth charges, a single QF 3-pounder Hotchkiss gun aft, and one set of twin 0.303-in machine guns. The specifications given are for the original 1940 British version. As the war moved on, the vessels were adapted to other roles and the armament was modified and upgraded such as the replacement of the 3-pounder with one or more 20 mm Oerlikon cannon and removal of the ASDIC dome for more clearance as minesweepers. Some boats were configured as motor torpedo boats.

Service
The first Fairmile B motor launch was completed in September 1940, with a further 38 from the first two production batches entering service before the end of the year.

All boats were essentially the same, although they could be adapted to serve in several roles by the expedient of having pre-drilled rails on their decks spaced to allow the fitting of various types of armaments. Although their armament initially reflected their main anti-submarine mission, nine of them were fitted with  torpedo tubes taken from ex-US Town-class destroyers; they formed the 2nd ML Flotilla tasked with anti-invasion duty, until the threat had passed.

During the Siege of Malta, they were used to sweep a narrow channel ahead of heavier minesweepers which widened the channel. The heavier minesweepers were initially the remnants of the Malta trawler force, then fleet minesweepers that arrived with a convoy from Gibraltar. The launches were able to pass over the mines whereas many trawler losses had been caused by the leading ship hitting a mine.

A number served in the St Nazaire Raid as assault transports, but their light construction meant that they suffered heavily; 12 B motor launches were lost in the action, out of 16 deployed.

During the Normandy landings a number of MLs were designated as navigation launches. These motor launches guided the landing craft onto the correct beaches. For this task the craft were fitted with splinter mats at the front for added protection. The main armament - the 3-pounder gun - was moved to the bow, an Oerlikon 20 mm cannon was fitted amidships and a Bofors 40 mm gun was installed at the stern. Smoke canister apparatus was installed at the rear of the craft and the number of depth charges was reduced. See main picture above of ML303 in this configuration.

Many were built as rescue motor launches with small sickbays aft of the engine room coaming, and classified as RML (rescue motor launch). These were numbered in the series RML492 to RML500, and RML511 to RML553.  Several more were converted to use as War Office ambulance launches with larger sickbays.

British Colonial or Commonwealth-built Fairmile B motor launches

Canadian built Fairmiles

Originally designed for the Royal Navy (RN) by W.J. Holt of the British Admiralty and built by British boatbuilder Fairmile Marine, during the Second World War 88 Fairmile B motor launches, with slight modifications for Canadian climatic and operational conditions, were built in Canada for service with the RCN in home waters. The first thirty-six Canadian Fairmile B type were designated and painted up as CML 01-36 (coastal motor launch). Eight Canadian Fairmiles (Q 392-Q 399) were built by Le Blanc for the RN and were transferred under Lend-Lease to the US Navy. The US Navy used the Canadian-built Fairmiles as submarine chasers (SC1466-1473).

Other British Colonial or Commonwealth built Fairmiles

At least two were built in the British colony of Bermuda, home to the dockyard and Admiralty house of the North America and West Indies Station, by what was to become Burland, Conyers & Marirea, Ltd.

New Zealand built 12 boats. These were used in New Zealand waters and around the Solomon Islands, and included HMNZS Maori and Kahu.

In Australia 35 boats entered service from October 1942. They were employed on routine patrols, convoy escorts, running special forces in and out of Japanese-held areas, in Papua New Guinea, boom defence patrols in harbours at home and abroad, courier operations, survey work, and raiding Japanese-held coasts. Of note the surrender of Japanese forces in the South West Pacific. On 10 September 1945, Rear-Admiral S. Sato, commanding officer of Kairiru and Muschu Islands, New Guinea, surrendered the Japanese forces on the islands to Major-General H. C. H. Robertson, commander of 6th Division on board the ML 805.

At least six boats (ML380-383,829 and 846) were built by South Africa and commissioned during November 1942. These were sent as the 49th Fairmile Flotilla (SANF) to Burma and deployed along the Arakan coast. The boats saw much action in support of ground forces and disrupting Japanese supply lines.

The Imperial Japanese Navy salvaged two that had been sunk and placed them in service.

A number of boats were built in Egypt by Thomas Cook & Son, who had a Cairo shipyard for constructing Nile tourist craft. Armament was fitted in Port Said. The first three to enter service in 1942 were MLs 355, 353 and 348. Post war they were often taken on as pleasure boats and a number of Fairmile Bs are on the National Register of Historic Vessels.

Fourteen Fairmile B were operated by the Italian Guardia di Finanza naval service, between 1947 and the 1980s.

Surviving examples
Four currently survive in the United Kingdom, two of which are in excellent condition. One is RML497. Many others of the type are known to survive around the world, some still in commercial service as tour boats.

See also
Fairmile A motor launch
 Fairmile C motor gun boat
 Fairmile D motor torpedo boat
 Fairmile H landing craft
 Coastal Forces of the Royal Navy
Coastal Forces of the Royal Canadian Navy
 R boat – slightly larger German equivalent

Notes

References
 Allied Coastal Forces of World War Two, Volume I : Fairmile designs and US Submarine Chasers - by John Lambert and Al Ross - 1990, 
 War at Sea - South African Maritime Operations during World War II : CJ Harris - 1991

Fairmile 'B' Class Launches Accessed 28 November 2007
 https://uboat.net/allies/warships/ship/14515.html ML347 built by Risdon Beazley Ltd NR Southampton became Eastern Princess at Great Yarmouth after the war and last heard of as a ferry in Skiathos.

External links

 Canadian Fairmile Q105 presently under restoration
 Fairmile Type B Motor Launch
 A Fairmile Submarine Chaser (photo of Fairmile B motor launch)
 Book on New-Zealand built Fairmiles used in New Zealand and the Solomons 
 The Fairmiles, Canada's Little Ships by Spud Roscoe 
 Stoker Harold Siddall Royal Navy, his service in ML.1030 and capture in Crete 1941 at naval-history.net
 Pictures of Fairmile models
 List of books at PT-boats.com
 Little ships
 Fairmile Radio Fit by Jerry Proc
Canada's Little Ships by Spud Roscoe

Gunboat classes
Gunboats of the Royal Navy
Military boats
Patrol boat classes
Ship classes of the Royal Navy
Submarine chaser classes
Torpedo boat classes